Emma-Louise Johnston is a freelance television presenter from Northern Ireland.

As well as television presenting, Johnston has worked as a reporter and producer. She worked for five years with ITV's breakfast programme, GMTV, having presented local travel programmes on local TV in her native Northern Ireland. She has reported for ITN and Australia's Seven News and has interviewed Leonardo DiCaprio, Steven Spielberg, Paul Squire, Tom Hanks and Kofi Annan.

In addition, Johnston has experience in reporting during riot situations in Northern Ireland. Other work includes hosting exhibitions and events and guest speaking.

References

External links
 Emma-Louise Johnston's website

Living people
Television presenters from Northern Ireland
GMTV presenters and reporters
Year of birth missing (living people)